Pivand Farms ( – Marghdāri Pīvand) is a village in Narjeh Rural District, in the Central District of Takestan County, Qazvin Province, Iran. At the 2006 census, its population was 21, in 6 families.

References 

Populated places in Takestan County